The Baháʼí Faith teaches the importance of faith. This entails accepting that the wisdom of God, as revealed by a Manifestation of God, is unfathomable and should be accepted. According to the Baháʼí perspective, faith and reason must always be compatible.

See also
Ethics in religion
Baháʼí teachings#Independent investigation of truth

References

External links
Eternal Quest for God: An Introduction to the Divine Philosophy of Abdu'l-Baha, by Julio Savi,  George Ronald, Publisher 1989
 Spiritualization of the Baháʼí Community A Plan for Teaching by National Spiritual Assembly of the Baháʼís of Ireland and Adib Taherzadeh, 1982.
 Reason and the Baháʼí Writings - The Use and Misuse of Logic and Persuasion by Ian Kluge, 2001-09-02
 The Concept of Spirituality, by William S. Hatcher, 1982.
 Examination of the Environmental Crisis, by Chris Jones, 2001
 Towards the Elimination of Religious Prejudice: Potential Christian Contributions From a Baháʼí Perspective by Chris Jones, 2004
 Will, Knowledge, and Love as Explained in Baháʼu'lláh's Four Valleys by Julio Savi, (1994)

Bahá'í belief and doctrine
Faith